Skiffes Creek Sand Spit Site is a historic archaeological site located at Newport News, Virginia. It is a well-preserved, possibly stratified archaeological site containing evidence of prehistoric habitation dating to the Early and Middle Woodland eras.  The site is invaluable to documenting settlement patterning and environmental and cultural adaptation in Tidewater Virginia during the period 500 B.C. to A.D. 500.

It was listed on the National Register of Historic Places in 1983.

References

Archaeological sites on the National Register of Historic Places in Virginia
National Register of Historic Places in Newport News, Virginia
Early Woodland period
Middle Woodland period
Former populated places in Virginia